Xynth is an embedded windowing system, released under LGPL, developed for systems with low resources, is an alternative for X Window System.
The goal of the project is to release a soft but portable and powered Window Environment.
The source language is C.
A fork of the project exists as XFast.

Architecture
Xynth act as interface between hardware and the desktop environment, working on much hardware, including embedded devices.

Features
 UDS (Unix Domain Sockets) for IPC
 DMA (Direct Memory Access) for each client window surface
 Overlapped client window - server management
 8-way Move, Resize
 Runtime Theme Pluging Support
 Built-in image renderer xpm, png
 Antialiased fonts with Freetype Library.
 No dependencies except FBDev or SVGALib
 Device independent basic low-level graphics library
 Overlay Drawing Ability
 Anti Flicker Double Buffer Rendering
 Keyboard, Mouse, Touchscreen drivers
 Remote Desktop Support.
 Built-in window manager.
 Low Memory and CPU Usage and Foot Print.
 In 1024x768x32bits mode with 253 clients open Memory usage is ~2,5M
 Static linked binary is of ~125K size.

See also

Affero General Public License
GNU Free Documentation License
GNAT Modified General Public License
GPL linking exception
Software using the LGPL (category)

Free windowing systems